City of First Love is a 1970 Soviet drama film directed by  and .

Plot 
The film consists of three short stories on a common theme. All stories take place in Stalingrad.

Cast 
 Yelena Alekina
 Natalya Egorova
 Boris Galkin
 Natalya Gvozdikova
 Lidiya Konstantinova
 Masha Odintsova
 Yuriy Orlov as Semyon
 Olga Ostroumova
 Stanislav Sadalskiy
 K. Sarokin
 Maria Vandova

References

External links 
 

1970 films
1970s Russian-language films
Soviet drama films
1970 drama films